Events from the year 1959 in Taiwan, Republic of China. This year is numbered Minguo 48 according to the official Republic of China calendar.

Incumbents
 President – Chiang Kai-shek
 Vice President – Chen Cheng
 Premier – Chen Cheng
 Vice Premier – Wang Yun-wu

Events

February
 1 February – The establishment of National Science Council.

August
 15 August – The magnitude 7.1 Hengchun earthquake occurs offshore southern Taiwan.

September
 21 September – Nantou shooting in Nantou County.

December
 16 December – The establishment of China Airlines.

Births
 17 January – Diane Lee, member of Legislative Yuan (1993–2002, 2008–2009)
 20 January – Huang Min-hui, Mayor of Chiayi City
 22 January
 Cho Jung-tai, Chairperson of Democratic Progressive Party
 Tseng Ming-chung, Chairperson of Financial Supervisory Commission (2013–2016)
 10 March – Tseng Chih-chen, baseball player
 31 March – Lin Cheng-sheng, film director
 6 August – Ko Wen-je, Mayor of Taipei
 13 August – Liu Shyh-fang, Secretary-General of Executive Yuan (2002–2004)
 8 September – Yu Cheng-hsien, Minister of the Interior (2002–2004)
 19 September – Hao Feng-ming, Political Deputy Minister of Labor
 8 October – Chang Ching-sen, Governor of Fujian Province (2016–2019)
 23 October – Woody Duh, Vice Premier (2016)
 6 November – Justin Huang, Magistrate of Taitung County (2009–2018)
 7 November – Lu Tien-ling, Minister of Council of Labor Affairs (2007–2008)
 28 December – Lu Chien-soon, golf athlete

References

 
Years of the 20th century in Taiwan